"Fighting for Love" is a single by Australian recording artist Dami Im, released on 21 October 2016. Upon its release, "Fighting for Love" debuted at number 64 on the Australian ARIA Singles Chart.

Im said "Fighting for Love" was partly inspired by her own struggles to fit in after immigrating to Australia from South Korea at the age of nine.

Im performed the song live on The X Factor Australia on 7 November 2016.

In 2017, the song won the OGAE Song Contest, organized by the official Eurovision Song Contest fan club.

Track listing
Digital download
"Fighting for Love" – 3:33

CD single
"Fighting for Love" – 3:33
"Fighting for Love" (instrumental) – 3:33

7th Heaven Remix
"Fight for Love" (7th Heaven Remix) – 3:27

Charts

Release history

References

2016 songs
2016 singles
Dami Im songs
Sony Music Australia singles
Songs written by Anthony Egizii
Songs written by David Musumeci
Song recordings produced by DNA Songs